Judith Steiger (born 27 October 1956) is a Swiss gymnast. She competed at the 1972 Summer Olympics.

References

External links
 

1956 births
Living people
Swiss female artistic gymnasts
Olympic gymnasts of Switzerland
Gymnasts at the 1972 Summer Olympics
Place of birth missing (living people)